This is a list of women writers who were born in Burkina Faso or whose writings are closely associated with that country.

 Angèle Bassolé-Ouédraogo (born 1967), French-language poet, Ivorian-Canadian journalist and poet raised in Burkina Faso
Sarah Bouyain (born 1968), French-Burkinabé writer and film director 
Monique Ilboudo (born 1959), author and human rights activist
Pauline Mvele (born 1969), actress, director and screenwriter
Roukiata Ouedraogo (born 1979), playwright and actress
Bernadette Sanou Dao (born 1952), author and politician
Adiza Sanoussi, nom de plume of the novelist Alizata Sana
Sobonfu Somé (died 2017), teacher and writer

See also
List of women writers
List of Burkinabé writers

References

-
Burkinabé women writers, List of
Writers, women